Rawlins County (standard abbreviation: RA) is a county located in the U.S. state of Kansas. As of the 2020 census, the county population was 2,561. The largest city and county seat is Atwood. It was named after Union Civil War General John Aaron Rawlins.

History

Early history

For many millennia, the Great Plains of North America was inhabited by nomadic Native Americans.  From the 16th century to 18th century, the Kingdom of France claimed ownership of large parts of North America.  In 1762, after the French and Indian War, France secretly ceded New France to Spain, per the Treaty of Fontainebleau.

19th century
In 1802, Spain returned most of the land to France, but keeping title to about 7,500 square miles.  In 1803, most of the land for modern day Kansas was acquired by the United States from France as part of the 828,000 square mile Louisiana Purchase for 2.83 cents per acre.

In 1854, the Kansas Territory was organized, then in 1861 Kansas became the 34th U.S. state.  In 1873, Rawlins County was established.

Geography

Major highways
 U.S. Highway 36
 Kansas Highway 25
 Kansas Highway 117

Adjacent counties
 Hitchcock County, Nebraska (north)
 Red Willow County, Nebraska (northeast)
 Decatur County (east)
 Thomas County (south)
 Sherman County (southwest/Mountain Time border)
 Cheyenne County (west)
 Dundy County, Nebraska (northwest/Mountain Time border)

Demographics

As of the census of 2000, there were 2,966 people, 1,269 households, and 846 families residing in the county.  The population density was 3 people per square mile (1/km2).  There were 1,565 housing units at an average density of 2 per square mile (1/km2).  The racial makeup of the county was 98.52% White, 0.30% Black or African American, 0.30% Native American, 0.10% Asian, 0.07% from other races, and 0.71% from two or more races.  0.81% of the population were Hispanic or Latino of any race.

There were 1,269 households, out of which 27.50% had children under the age of 18 living with them, 59.50% were married couples living together, 4.90% had a female householder with no husband present, and 33.30% were non-families. 31.40% of all households were made up of individuals, and 17.60% had someone living alone who was 65 years of age or older.  The average household size was 2.29 and the average family size was 2.88.

In the county, the population was spread out, with 24.00% under the age of 18, 3.80% from 18 to 24, 21.50% from 25 to 44, 25.10% from 45 to 64, and 25.60% who were 65 years of age or older.  The median age was 45 years. For every 100 females there were 99.90 males.  For every 100 females age 18 and over, there were 95.10 males.

The median income for a household in the county was $32,105, and the median income for a family was $40,074. Males had a median income of $26,719 versus $19,750 for females. The per capita income for the county was $17,161.  About 7.90% of families and 12.50% of the population were below the poverty line, including 18.00% of those under age 18 and 8.90% of those age 65 or over.

Government

Presidential elections

The county is part of the highly Republican Kansas's 1st congressional district. It has favored the Republican candidate for President in each of the last eighteen elections. The last Democrat to carry the county was Franklin D. Roosevelt in 1936, when the GOP standard bearer was Kansas Governor Alf Landon. In the last five Presidential elections the Democratic candidate has never received more than 21% of the county's vote.

Law
Following amendment to the Kansas Constitution in 1986, the county remained a prohibition, or "dry", county until 2002, when voters approved the sale of alcoholic liquor by the individual drink with a 30% food sales requirement.

Education

Unified school districts
 Rawlins County USD 105

Communities

Cities
 Atwood
 Herndon
 McDonald

Unincorporated communities
† means a Census-Designated Place (CDP) by the United States Census Bureau.
 Blakeman
 Ludell†

Townships
Rawlins County is divided into ten townships.  None of the cities within the county are considered governmentally independent, and all figures for the townships include those of the cities.  In the following table, the population center is the largest city (or cities) included in that township's population total, if it is of a significant size.

See also

References

Further reading

 Standard Atlas of Rawlins County, Kansas; Geo. A. Ogle & Co; 64 pages; 1906.

External links

County
 
 Rawlins County - Directory of Public Officials
 Rawlins County - Community Development
Other
 Rawlins County Square Deal News, newspaper
Maps
 Rawlins County Maps: Current, Historic, KDOT
 Kansas Highway Maps: Current, Historic, KDOT
 Kansas Railroad Maps: Current, 1996, 1915, KDOT and Kansas Historical Society

 
Kansas counties
1873 establishments in Kansas
Populated places established in 1873